Soura, known as Sovur in Kashmiri, is a notified area in Srinagar district of the Indian union territory of Jammu and Kashmir. It is located about 9 km north of Lal Chowk, Srinagar on Srinagar-Ladakh Highway in Jammu and Kashmir, India. Soura is noted for Sher-i-Kashmir Institute of Medical Sciences, a multi-specialty hospital. Besides serving as a hospital, it is the medical deemed university of Kashmir valley. Soura is located near Anchar Lake. The whole western side of the area is covered by Anchar Lake.
It also hosts a famous Muslim Shrine known as Asar-e-Sharif Jinab Sahib Soura which holds more than 13 holy relics.

Education
The area is considered one of the key education centres in the city. The following is the list of colleges and schools in the area:
 Sher-i-Kashmir Institute of Medical Sciences. The institute provides post-graduate, doctoral, and post-doctoral courses in multiple disciplines of medicine; and undergraduate, postgraduate, and doctoral courses in paramedical courses and nursing. 
 Government Boys Higher Secondary.
 Government Girls Higher Secondary.
 S M dedicated high school.
 Standard Public High School.
 Ramzan Memorial Educational Institute.
 Zulfkar Public High School.
 Mother Land public school.
 Iqbal Public School.
 Darul Iqra Public School.
 Metro Educational Institute.
 Mahad Al-Lugat-ul Arabia.
Besides these, there are several primary and middle schools in Soura.

See also
 Anchar Lake
 90 Feet Road
 Buchpora
 Nowhatta

References 

Srinagar
Cities and towns in Srinagar district
Srinagar district